Special routes of U.S. Route 160 exist across Colorado.

Colorado

Mancos
Major intersections

Bayfield
Major intersections

References

60-1

U.S. Highways in Colorado